The 2017 European Wildwater Championships was the 11th edition of the global wildwater canoeing competition, European Wildwater Championships, organised by the European Canoe Association.

Events

Classic
K1 men classic
K1 women classic
K1 men classic teams
K1 women classic teams
Sprint
K1 men sprint
K1 women sprint
K1 men sprint teams
K1 women sprint teams

Classic
C1 men classic
C1 women classic
C1 men classic teams
 
Sprint
C1 men sprint
C1 women sprint
C1 men sprint teams
C1 women sprint teams

Classic
C2 men classic
C2 women classic
C2 men classic teams
 
Sprint
C2 men sprint
C2 women sprint
C2 men sprint teams

K1 Classic

Men

Women

Men team

Women team

K1 Sprint

Men

Women

Men team

Women team

C1 Classic

Men

Women

Men team

C1 Sprint

Men

Women

Men team

Women team

C1 Classic

Men

Women

Men team

C2 Sprint

Men

Women

Men team

See also
 Wildwater canoeing
 European Canoe Association

References

External links
 

2017 in the Republic of Macedonia
European Wildwater Championships